Japonoconger caribbeus is an eel in the family Congridae (conger/garden eels). It was described by David G. Smith and Robert H. Kanazawa in 1977. It is a marine, deep water-dwelling eel which is known only from the Caribbean Sea (off the coast of Colombia and Venezuela, from which its species epithet is derived), in the western central Atlantic Ocean.

References

Congridae
Taxa named by David G. Smith
Taxa named by Robert H. Kanazawa
Fish described in 1977